The Leader of the Opposition in the Senate (French: chef de l'opposition au Sénat) is the leader of the largest opposition group in the Senate of France. The status has no official recognition in the French Constitution. What is more, the ideological differences between groups in the Senate is smaller than as usual, as the powers of the Senate allow it, at best, to lengthen the time for a bill.

Following the 2011 Senate election and the victory of the Socialists, Jean-Claude Gaudin became the first right-wing Senate Opposition Leader under the Fifth Republic. Eight people have held the position since its establishment in 1959. The current officeholder is Patrick Kanner.

List of Opposition Leaders under the Fifth Republic
Political parties:

References 

Members of the Senate (France)
France